Bushy Park is a rural locality and town in the local government area of Derwent Valley in the South-east region of Tasmania. The 2016 census determined a population of 126 for the state suburb of Bushy Park.

History
Bushy Park was gazetted as a locality in 1959.

Geography
The Styx River forms the western, northern and north-eastern boundaries, where it flows into the Derwent River, which then forms much of the eastern boundary.

Road infrastructure
The B61 route (Gordon River Road) enters from the east and runs through via the town to the north, where it exits. Route B62 (Glenora Road) starts at an intersection with B62 and runs south and south-east until it exits. Route C610 (Uxbridge Road) starts at an intersection with B62 and runs south-west and south until it exits.

Climate

References

Localities of Derwent Valley Council
Towns in Tasmania